The López Museum and Library, also known as simply the Lopez Museum, is a Philippine art and history museum and library located in Pasig, Philippines at the ground floor of the Benpres Building, Exchange Road corner Meralco Avenue, Ortigas Center.

History 
The López Museum and Library was on February 13, 1960, by Eugenio López Sr. It was among the first privately run museums in the Philippines and was originally housed inside a four-storey building designed by Angel Nakpil along Lancaster Street in Pasay.

Initially founded as the López Memorial Museum, the institution was originally meant to be dedicated to López's parents, Benito and Presentacion López but shifted to maintaining a collection dedicated to Filipino heritage. Under its first curator, Renato Constantino, the museum acquired the Juan Luna painting, España y Filipinas which complemented López growing collection of Filipiniana books and maps.

The López Museum moved to the Benpres Building in Pasig on April 19, 1986, with its previous building in Pasay later demolished.

In 2012, it was announced that the López Museum would be moving to a building at the Rockwell Center in Makati. However it was only in 2017, that the museum that the relocation process has started. The museum was closed as part of preparations for its relocation. The museum's collection will be split in two locations: at the Eugenio Lopez Center in Antipolo, Rizal and a space at The Proscenium at Rockwell.

Collection
The López Museum and Library is dedicated to housing artworks by reputed Filipino artists such as Juan Luna, and Felix Resurreccion Hidalgo, Rizaliana memorabilia and Filipiniana materials and publications.

External links

References

Museums in Pasig
Art museums established in 1960
Biographical museums in the Philippines
Art museums and galleries in the Philippines
History museums
Archaeological museums
Research libraries
Buildings and structures in Pasig
1960 establishments in the Philippines
Libraries in Metro Manila